Embroidery capital may refer to:
Union City, New Jersey "Embroidery Capital of the United States"  
Lumban, Laguna "Embroidery Capital of the Philippines" 
Surat "Embroidery Capital of the India"